Crucifixion with Mourners and St Dominic is a fresco fragment by Fra Angelico, executed c. 1435, from the refectory of the Convent of San Domenico, Fiesole, now in the Louvre.

Like the same artist's Coronation of the Virgin from the same convent, it was removed and taken to France after it was suppressed under the Napoleonic occupation. After the Bourbon Restoration, it was one of around a hundred works not to be returned to Italy, nominally due to their dimensions and the difficulties of transporting them.

Christ is shown with his head leaning on his chest (possibly developing studies from below of Masaccio's Pisa Crucifixion). At the centre is Saint Dominic, with the Virgin Mary and John the Evangelist either side of the cross.

References

Paintings by Fra Angelico
Frescos formerly in churches in Italy
Paintings in the Louvre by Italian artists
1435 paintings
Paintings of Saint Dominic
Paintings of the Virgin Mary
Paintings depicting John the Apostle
Fra Angelico